Đorđe Milosavljević (born August 31, 1994) is a Serbian professional basketball player for Mladost Zemun of the Basketball League of Serbia.

External links
 Đorđe Milosavljević at abaliga.com
 Đorđe Milosavljević at kk.radnicki.rs

1994 births
Living people
ABA League players
Basketball League of Serbia players
KK Mladost Zemun players
KKK Radnički players
KK Radnički KG 06 players
KK Radnički Kragujevac (2009–2014) players
KK Plana players
Serbian expatriate basketball people in Georgia (country)
Serbian expatriate basketball people in Spain
Sportspeople from Kragujevac
Point guards
Serbian men's basketball players